Hygiea (minor-planet designation: 10 Hygiea) is a major asteroid and possible dwarf planet located in the main asteroid belt. In some spectral classifications it is the largest of the dark C-type asteroids with a carbonaceous surface, whereas in others it is second after 1 Ceres.

Observations taken with the Very Large Telescope's SPHERE imager in 2017 and 2018, and announced in late 2019, revealed that Hygiea is nearly spherical and is close to a hydrostatic equilibrium shape. The authors of the study therefore consider it a possible dwarf planet. However, Hygiea is conjectured to have been disrupted by an impact, with the subsequent debris reaccumulating, rather than being massive enough to be plastic. The disruptive impact produced the largest known collisional family.

Observation

Despite its size, Hygiea appears very dim when observed from Earth. This is due to its dark surface and its position in the outer main belt. For this reason, six smaller asteroids were observed before Annibale de Gasparis discovered Hygiea on 12 April 1849. At most oppositions, Hygiea has a magnitude that is four magnitudes dimmer than Vesta's, and observing it typically requires at least a  telescope. However, while at a perihelic opposition, it can be observed just with 10x50 binoculars as Hygiea would have a magnitude of +9.1.

Discovery and name
On 12 April 1849, in Naples, Italy, astronomer Annibale de Gasparis (age 29) discovered Hygiea. It was the first of his nine asteroid discoveries. The director of the Naples observatory, Ernesto Capocci, named the asteroid. He chose to call it Igea Borbonica ("Bourbon Hygieia"), after the Greek goddess of health, daughter of Asclepius, and in honor of the ruling family of the Kingdom of the Two Sicilies where Naples was located.

In 1852, John Russell Hind wrote that "it is universally termed Hygiea, the unnecessary appendage 'Borbonica' being dropped." The English form is an irregular spelling of Greek Hygieia or Hygeia (Latin Hygea or Hygia).

Symbol
The intended astronomical symbol for Hygiea was a zeta-shaped serpent crowned with a star:  the serpent and serpent drinking from a bowl are traditional symbols of the goddess Hygieia (cf. U+1F54F 🕏). In later years it was substituted with a rod of Asclepius:  (a serpent twined around a staff, U+2695 ⚕), confusing Hygieia with her masculine counterpart. These symbols are now both largely obsolete. In this century, 10 Hygiea has seen some minor astrological use, and its symbol was confused once again, with Asclepsius's rod replaced by Mercury's caduceus: , though in a more elaborate form (U+2BDA ⯚) than the symbol of the planet Mercury. The caduceus has long been mistaken for the rod of Asclepius.

Physical characteristics

Based on spectral evidence, Hygiea's surface is thought to consist of primitive carbonaceous materials similar to those found in carbonaceous chondrite meteorites. Aqueous alteration products have been detected on its surface, which could indicate the presence of water ice in the past which was heated sufficiently to melt. The primitive present surface composition would indicate that Hygiea had not been melted during the early period of Solar System formation, in contrast to other large planetesimals like 4 Vesta. However, observations in 2019 suggest Hygiea had suffered a head-on collision which had disrupted it, with its re-accretion resulting in its present spherical shape. No deep basins are visible in the VLT images, indicating that any large craters must have flat floors, consistent with an icy C-type composition.

In images taken with the Very Large Telescope imager in 2017, a bright surface feature is visible, as well as at least two dark craters, which have been informally named Serpens and Calix after the Latin words for snake and cup, respectively. Serpens has a size of 180 km, Calix is about 90 km in diameter.

Hygiea is the largest of the class of dark C-type asteroids that are dominant in the outer asteroid belt, beyond the Kirkwood gap at 2.82 AU. Hygiea has an average diameter of 434 ± 14 km. While early studies (Ragazzoni et al., 2000) have found a noticeably oblate shape with a semimajor axis ratio of 1.11 (much more than for the other objects in the "big four"—2 Pallas, 4 Vesta and the dwarf planet Ceres), recent results indicate that Hygiea is more spherical, with an axis ratio of 1.06, consistent with a MacLaurin ellipsoid. Aside from being the smallest of the "big four", Hygiea, like Ceres, has a relatively low density, which is more comparable to the icy satellites of Jupiter or Saturn than to the terrestrial planets or the stony asteroids.

Although it is the largest body in its region, due to its dark surface and farther-than-average distance from the Sun, Hygiea appears very dim when observed from Earth. In fact, it is the third dimmest of the first twenty-three asteroids discovered, with only 13 Egeria and 17 Thetis having lower mean opposition magnitudes. At most oppositions, Hygiea has a magnitude of around +10.2, which is as much as four orders fainter than Vesta, and observation calls for at least a  telescope to resolve. However, at a perihelic opposition, Hygiea can reach +9.1 magnitude and may just be resolvable with 10x50 binoculars, unlike the next two largest asteroids in the asteroid belt, 704 Interamnia and 511 Davida, which are always beyond binocular visibility.

A total of 17 stellar occultations by Hygiea have been tracked by Earth-based astronomers, including two (in 2002 and 2014) that were seen by a large number of observers. The observations have been used to constrain Hygiea's size, shape and rotation axis.

Orbit and rotation

Orbiting at an average of 3.14 AU from the Sun, Hygiea is the most distant of the "big four" asteroids. It lies closer to the ecliptic as well, with an orbital inclination of 4°. Its orbit is less circular than those of Ceres or Vesta, with an eccentricity of around 0.12. Its perihelion is at a quite similar longitude to those of Vesta and Ceres, though its ascending and descending nodes are opposite to the corresponding ones for those objects. Although its perihelion is extremely close to the mean distance of Ceres and Pallas, a collision between Hygiea and its larger companions is impossible because at that distance they are always on opposite sides of the ecliptic. In 2056, Hygiea will pass 0.025 AU from Ceres, and then in 2063, Hygiea will pass 0.020 AU from Pallas. At aphelion Hygiea reaches out to the extreme edge of the asteroid belt at the perihelia of the Hilda family, which is in a 3:2 orbital resonance with Jupiter.

As one of the most massive asteroids, Hygiea is used by the Minor Planet Center to calculate perturbations.

Hygiea is in an unstable three-body mean motion resonance with Jupiter and Saturn. The computed Lyapunov time for this asteroid is 30,000 years, indicating that it occupies a chaotic orbit that will change randomly over time because of gravitational perturbations by the planets. It is the lowest numbered asteroid in such a resonance (the next lowest numbered being 70 Panopaea).

Hygiea has a rotation period of about 13.8256 hours, determined from observations with the VLT in 2017 and 2018. Its single-peaked light curve has an amplitude of 0.27 mag, which is largely attributed to albedo variations. , the direction of Hygiea's rotation is not known, due to a twofold ambiguity in lightcurve data that is exacerbated by its long rotation period—which makes single-night telescope observations span at best only a fraction of a full rotation—but it is believed to be retrograde.  Lightcurve analysis indicates that Hygiea's pole points towards either ecliptic coordinates (β, λ) = (30°, 115°) or (30°, 300°) with a 10° uncertainty.  This gives an axial tilt of about 60° in both cases.

Hygiea family

Hygiea is the main member of the Hygiean asteroid family that constitutes about 1% of asteroids in the main belt. The family was formed when an object with a diameter of about 100 km collided with proto-Hygiea about 2 billion years ago. Because the impact craters on Hygiea today are too small to contain the volume of ejected material, it is thought that Hygiea was completely disrupted by the impact and that the majority of the debris recoalesced after the pieces that formed the rest of the family had escaped. Hygiea contains almost all the mass (over 98%) of the family.

See also
 Former classification of planets

Notes

References

External links 
 A simulation of the orbit of Hygiea
 Stellar occultation of 11 August 2013 (video)
  (displays Elong from Sun and V mag for 2011)
 
 

Hygiea asteroids
Hygiea
Hygiea
Possible dwarf planets
C-type asteroids (Tholen)
C-type asteroids (SMASS)
18490412
18490412